"Nothing Lasts Forever" is a single by Echo & the Bunnymen which was released in 1997. It was the first single released after Ian McCulloch, Will Sergeant and Les Pattinson reformed the band. It was also the first single to be released from their 1997 album,  Evergreen. It reached number 8 on the UK Singles Chart. The single was released as a 7-inch single and as two separate CD versions – apart from the title track all three releases had different track listings. The French and German versions of the CD releases also had different track listings.

The video was shot in Marrakech, Morocco.

It was the last song to be played by Janice Long on her final show on Radio 2, on 26 January 2017. It was also the last song played on The Christian O'Connell Breakfast Show on Absolute Radio on 18 May 2018.

Track listings
All tracks written by Will Sergeant, Ian McCulloch and Les Pattinson.

UK 7-inch release (London LON396)
"Nothing Lasts Forever"
"Hurracaine"
"Jonny"

UK CD release (London LONCD396)
"Nothing Lasts Forever" – 3:53
"Watchtower" – 4:25
"Polly" – 4:17

UK alternate CD release (London LOCDP396)
"Nothing Lasts Forever" – 3:55
"Colour Me In" – 4:00
"Antelope" – 2:44

French/German CD release (London 8509612)
"Nothing Lasts Forever"
"Colour Me In"
"Antelope"
"Jonny"

French/German alternate CD release (London 8509592)
"Nothing Lasts Forever"
"Watchtower"
"Polly"
"Hurricane"

Chart positions

Personnel

Musicians
Ian McCulloch – vocals, guitar
Will Sergeant – lead guitar
Les Pattinson – bass
Liam Gallagher – backing vocals and handclaps ("Nothing Lasts Forever")
Paul “Bonehead” Arthurs – handclaps

Production
Echo & the Bunnymen – producer
Markus Butler – engineer ("Watchtower", "Polly", "Colour Me In", "Jonny")
Clif Norrell – mixed by ("Nothing Lasts Forever")
Norman Watson – photographer

References

1997 singles
Echo & the Bunnymen songs
Songs written by Will Sergeant
Songs written by Ian McCulloch (singer)